Nykänen is a Finnish surname. Notable people with the surname include:

Antti Nykänen (born 1983), Finnish basketball player
Harri Nykänen (born 1953), Finnish crime writer
Juho Nykänen (born 1985), Finnish footballer
Matti Nykänen (1963–2019), Finnish ski jumper 
Taneli Nykänen (1845–1927), Finnish farmer and politician
Valfrid Nykänen (1894–1918), Finnish World War I fighter pilot

Finnish-language surnames